The following is a comprehensive discography of White Lion, an American/Danish glam metal band, consists of five studio albums, 3 live albums, six compilation albums, 21 singles, and 5 video albums. This list does not include solo material or sideprojects performed by the members.

White Lion was formed in New York City in 1983 by Danish vocalist Mike Tramp and American guitarist Vito Bratta. Mainly active in the 1980s and early 1990s, releasing their debut album Fight to Survive in 1985. The band achieved success with their number eight hit "Wait" and number three hit "When the Children Cry" from their second album, the double platinum selling Pride. The band continued their success with their third album, Big Game which achieved Gold status and their fourth album Mane Attraction which included a supporting tour. White Lion disbanded in 1992 and not long after their first compilation album, The Best of White Lion was released.

Tramp reformed White Lion with all new musicians in 1999 and again following a failed attempt to reform the original line up and several legal issues in 2004. The new White Lion released a live album in 2005 and a brand new studio album Return of the Pride in 2008.

Studio albums

Live albums

Compilations

Box sets

Singles

Videos

Music videos

References

Discographies of American artists
Discographies of Danish artists
Heavy metal discographies